Lilith "Lilit" Naggar (born 1935, Hebrew: לילית נגר), also known as Layla Najar (Arabic: ليلى نجار), is an Israeli Arabic-language television host, actress, and singer.

Biography
Lilit Naggar was born on August 22, 1935 in Mandate Palestine but grew up in Egypt. The family returned to Israel after the establishment of the state. At the age of 15, she settled with her family on Kibbutz Shluhot, a modern-orthodox kibbutz affiliated with the Religious Kibbutz Movement. Naggar was married to Zouzou Moussa, an Egyptian-born musician who played with the Israel Radio Arabic orchestra.

Music, theater and television career
At 17, Nagar recorded her first song, which became a hit. Early in her career she performed original Hebrew songs and songs from Hebrew musicals. but gradually established herself as an Israeli Arab-language TV anchor and singer. She took an active part in Mizrahi music festivals featuring music of Middle Eastern and Mediterranean origin. One of the first hits of Zohar Argov, one of Israel's leading Mizrahi singers, was a cover version of one of Nagar’s songs.

As an actress she performed with the Beit Lessin Theater group. In the early 1970s, she hosted an Arabic-language children's show on Israeli television, “The Flying Carpet.” In 1972, she appeared in the theatre comedy “Catch.” In 1977, she played in the movie “Midnight Entertainment Lady." In 1981, she landed a part in  “The End of Milton Levi” (1981). In 1983, she appeared in TV drama series “Michel Ezra Safra and Sons” based on a novel by Amnon Shamosh. Participated in "HaShir Shelanu" (2007).

See also
Television in Israel
Music in Israel

References

External links
Zemer Reshet
Songs of Lilit Nagar at Shiron.net

1935 births
Living people
20th-century Israeli women singers
Israeli television personalities